OSF may refer to:

Computing
 Open Science Framework, a cloud-based management for open access science 
 Open Semantic Framework, an integrated software stack using semantic technologies for knowledge management
 OSF/1, a Unix-like operating system developed by the Open Software Foundation
 Opera Show Format, an XHTML-based slideshow format

Organisations
 Ógra Shinn Féin, the youth wing of the Sinn Féin political party
 Open Software Foundation, a not-for-profit organization that merged with X/Open and then became The Open Group
 Open Society Foundations, a grantmaking body established by George Soros
 OpenStack Foundation, a non-profit corporate entity to promote OpenStack software and its community
 Operational Support Facility, of the Federal Aviation Administration
 Oregon Shakespeare Festival, a repertory theatre in Ashland, Oregon, US
 Oxford Scientific Films, a British producer of natural history and documentary programmes
 The Old Spaghetti Factory, a restaurant chain
 Independent Senate Fraction (Onafhankelijke Senaatsfractie), a political group of the Netherlands
 Order of Saint Francis, a 21st-century American Franciscan religious order
 Oklahoma Office of State Finance, an agency of the Government of Oklahoma, US
 OSF Global Services, a cloud technology company
 OSF Healthcare, a non-profit healthcare organization in Illinois and Michigan, US